"Laredo" is a song written and recorded by American country music artist Chris Cagle.  It was released in February 2001 as the second single from his debut album Play It Loud.  It peaked at #8 on the Hot Country Songs chart.

Content
The song is a recollection of a lost lover that the narrator has had in the city of Laredo, Texas. It is composed in the key of F major. Cagle said that the idea came to him one morning when he was listening to his radio and driving on Interstate 40. He heard "Galveston" by Glen Campbell on the radio and began thinking of other songs about cities in Texas. He decided to pick Laredo, Texas because it was one of the few cities for which he could not think of an existing song. After seeing a billboard that said "invest in your city's future", he came up with the concept of "a city being treated like an individual" and "pleading with the city to not let her leave."

Music video
The music video was directed by Eric Welch. It shows Cagle trying to find his lover (who is seen in a stunning red dress) throughout a stone castle. His every chance at finding her fails, but in the end before disappearing she leaves a piece of her dress on the ground for him to keep in memory. Scenes of Cagle performing the song inside different parts of the stone building are seen throughout, as well as shots of the woman by herself sitting on a high wall and in a room filled with candles (where one of the performance scenes also takes place). It was filmed over 2 days in Lost Pines, TX, at a historic castle made entirely of stone, built in the 1800s.

Chart performance
"Laredo" debuted at number 60 on the U.S. Billboard Hot Country Singles & Tracks chart for the week of February 17, 2001.

Year-end charts

References

2001 singles
2000 songs
Chris Cagle songs
Songs written by Chris Cagle
Virgin Records singles